Yoel Romero Palacio (born April 30, 1977) is a Cuban professional mixed martial artist and former freestyle wrestler. He currently competes in the Light Heavyweight division for Bellator MMA. Romero formerly competed in the Middleweight division for the Ultimate Fighting Championship (UFC), and he was a four-time challenger for the UFC Middleweight Championship. As a freestyle wrestler, Romero competed at 85 kilograms, and he was the '99 World Champion (five-time medalist at the World Championships), the '00 Olympic Silver medalist, a three-time World Cup winner (six-time medalist), the '03 Pan American Games Gold medalist (bronze medalist in '99) and a five-time Pan American Champion.

As of February 7, 2023, he is #3 in the Bellator Light Heavyweight Rankings.

Wrestling career
Romero started training in wrestling in the 1990s, and eventually representing Cuba at senior level in the FILA Wrestling World Championships, which is held in non-Olympic years, from 1997–2005. At the 1999 World Wrestling Championships Romero became world champion by defeating the 1996 Olympic gold medalist, Khadzhimurad Magomedov of Russia. He missed out on becoming world champion again in 2002. After landing a three-point throw against Adam Saitiev to take a 3–2 lead, Romero was penalized a point for passivity with 20 seconds remaining. In overtime, after a scramble that saw Romero end on top, it was judged Saitiev had scored in the interim.

Romero competed in the 2000 Summer Olympics and the 2004 Summer Olympics, representing his home nation of Cuba. He won the silver medal in the 2000 freestyle competition, losing to Adam Saitiev in the finals.  He finished in fourth place in 2004. While competing in freestyle wrestling, Romero has defeated three Olympic gold medal winners, and five different world champions. Among them were Americans Cael Sanderson and Les Gutches, both of whom Romero has multiple victories over.

Romero medaled in five world championships, only missing out with his fifth-place finish in 1997, and a sixth-place finish in 2003, when he was battling injuries. Other notable achievements include a gold medal at the 2003 Pan American Games, a quadrennial competition held the year before the Olympics, as well as multiple medal-winning finishes at the FILA Wrestling World Cup. Romero competed infrequently after 2005: he was suspended for all of 2006 by the Cuban Wrestling Federation for allegedly throwing his match against Mindorashvili at the 2005 World Championships. After winning the Grand Prix of Germany in the summer of 2007, he did not return to Cuba, choosing instead to remain in Germany.

Romero then joined the Ringer-Bundesliga, a professional wrestling league in Germany, in which teams compete for team titles. Romero competed as a starting member of SV Johannis Nuremberg, as well as helping coach and train the team. Eventually he began to transition into MMA.

Mixed martial arts career

Early career
After defecting to Germany in 2007, Romero made his professional mixed martial arts debut in December 2009. From 2008 to 2011, Romero was trained by Sergej Kuftin (combat sambo & MMA coach) and Zike Simic (kickboxing coach), both of whom were from Peter Althof's "Martial Arts Gym Nürnberg". Over the three years, Romero amassed a record of 5–0 in various promotions in Germany and Poland.

Romero won his debut via TKO against Sascha Weinpolter. In his second bout, he scored a 62-second finish via TKO against Ricky Pulu. He then took on Polish standout Michał Fijałka in his third bout. Romero won in the third round via TKO, which was at first ruled a controversial disqualification, due to a knee on the ground thrown by Romero. In 2011, he won his next three fights via TKO in the first round.

Strikeforce
Romero signed with Strikeforce in July 2011 and made his promotional debut against Rafael Cavalcante on September 10, 2011 at Strikeforce 36. He lost the fight via KO in the second round. A neck injury kept him out of action until 2013.

Ultimate Fighting Championship

2013 
After Strikeforce was purchased and absorbed by the UFC, Romero made his promotional and middleweight debut against Clifford Starks on April 20, 2013, at UFC on Fox 7. He won the fight via flying knee knockout in the first round. This win earned him Knockout of the Night honors.

Romero was expected to face Derek Brunson on August 31, 2013, at UFC 164. However, Brunson suffered an injury and pulled out of the bout. Promotional newcomer Brian Houston was briefly linked as a replacement, however Houston was not medically cleared to compete at the event and the bout was canceled. In his second UFC bout, Romero faced Ronny Markes on November 6, 2013, at UFC Fight Night 31. He won the fight via knockout in the third round.

2014 
For his third fight, Romero was again set to face Derek Brunson on January 15, 2014, at UFC Fight Night 35. After trailing for two rounds, Romero won the fight in the third via TKO due to punches and elbows to Brunson's body. Both fighters earned a $50,000 a Fight of the Night bonus award. 

In his fourth fight, Romero faced Brad Tavares at UFC on Fox 11. He won the fight via unanimous decision.

Romero faced Tim Kennedy on September 27, 2014, at UFC 178. He won the fight via TKO in the third round, giving Kennedy his first stoppage loss in thirteen years. This fight generated much controversy: Romero was hurt badly at the end of round 2, and received extra time to recover between rounds. UFC color commentator Joe Rogan mistakenly blamed this on Romero's cornermen for failing to leave the Octagon on time, when the blame was actually on a UFC Cutman who applied too much Vaseline to a cut and referee John McCarthy for allowing Romero to stay sitting while trying to get the cutman to return to the octagon to wipe the excess off. Later it was also noticed that Kennedy was illegally holding Romero's glove while striking him at end of round 2.

The win earned Romero his second Fight of the Night  bonus award.

2015 
Romero was expected to face Ronaldo Souza on February 28, 2015, at UFC 184. However, Souza pulled out of the fight on January 15, 2015, due to pneumonia. The bout was rescheduled  for April 18, 2015, at UFC on Fox 15. However, Romero was forced out of the fight by a ligament and meniscus tear in his knee. He was replaced by Chris Camozzi.

Romero faced former light heavyweight champion Lyoto Machida on June 27, 2015, at UFC Fight Night 70. This was the first UFC event, headlining Romero in the main event. He knocked out Machida at 1:38 of the third round with a series of elbows from top position. Romero was awarded a "Performance of the Night" bonus.

The bout with Ronaldo Souza was scheduled for a third time, eventually taking place on December 12, 2015, at UFC 194. Romero won the fight via split decision. 2 of 17 media outlets scored the bout in favor of Romero.

2016 
Romero faced former middleweight champion Chris Weidman on November 12, 2016, at UFC 205. He won the fight via knockout in the third round and was awarded a Performance of the Night bonus. It was announced that Romero was next-in-line for a title shot, after owning an 8-match winning streak.

2017 
With middleweight champion Michael Bisping sidelined due to injury, Romero fought Robert Whittaker on July 8, 2017 at UFC 213 for the interim UFC Middleweight Championship. Romero lost the fight by unanimous decision.

2018 

Romero was scheduled to face David Branch on February 24, 2018 at UFC on Fox 28. However,  on January 13, 2018, it was reported that Whittaker had pulled out of his bout against Luke Rockhold, which was scheduled to take place at UFC 221, due to an undisclosed injury. It was announced he would be replaced by Romero in what was to be a fight for the interim UFC Middleweight Championship. The winner of this bout would then face Whittaker in a  unification bout.  At the weigh-ins, Romero came in at 188.3 lbs in his first attempt. He was given another two hours to make 185 lbs but failed to make weight, ending up 2.7 pounds over the middleweight limit of 185 lbs. As a result, Romero would not have been eligible for the interim championship had he won the fight. Romero was fined 30% of his purse, which was awarded to Rockhold. If Rockhold were to win, he would still be awarded the championship. Romero won the fight via KO in the third round. Romero knocked Rockhold down with a heavy overhand followed up with a punch on the ground that rendered Rockhold unconscious.

A rematch with Whittaker took place on June 9, 2018 at UFC 225. At the weight-ins, Romero missed weight, coming in at 186 pounds, 1 pound over the middleweight limit for a title fight. Romero was given additional time to make weight but was pulled by the commission, weighing in at 185.2 lbs, 0.2 pounds over. Romero was fined 20% of his fight purse and the fight proceeded as a non-title catchweight bout. Romero lost the back-and-forth fight by a close split decision. The fight was awarded as Fight of the Night, but due to Romero missing weight, Whittaker received both $50,000 bonuses for a total of $100,000.

2019 
Romero was scheduled to face Paulo Costa on November 3, 2018 at UFC 230. However, Romero indicated in mid-August that while he has been cleared to fight, his doctors have recommended that he wait another four to five months (early 2019) to allow facial injuries incurred during his most recent fight to fully heal.

Romero was scheduled to face Ronaldo Souza on April 27, 2019 at UFC Fight Night 150. However, it was reported that Romero pulled out of the bout in early in April 2019 due to illness and was replaced by Jack Hermansson.

Romero faced Paulo Costa on  August 17, 2019 at UFC 241. After trailing for the first two rounds, he dominated the third round in one of the greatest 3-round fights in the history of the UFC. As he fell back in the numbers, he lost the fight via unanimous decision. This fight earned him the Fight of the Night award.

2020 
Romero next faced Israel Adesanya on March 7, 2020 UFC 248 for the UFC middleweight title. He lost the fight via unanimous decision. Many fans and pundits felt disappointed due to the low activity by both fighters, which resulted in a largely uneventful fight in which neither fighter was able to deliver any significant offense.

Romero was scheduled to face Uriah Hall on August 22, 2020 at UFC on ESPN 15. However, Romero pulled out of the fight on August 11 for undisclosed reasons. The bout was subsequently cancelled.

On December 4, Romero announced his departure from the UFC and became a free agent.

Bellator MMA 
On December 14, 2020, it was announced that Romero had agreed to a multi-fight deal with Bellator MMA and is expected to compete in its light heavyweight division beginning in 2021.

On February 9, 2021, it was announced that Romero would be participating in the Bellator Light Heavyweight World Grand Prix Tournament. He was scheduled to face Anthony Johnson in the quarterfinal round at Bellator 257 on April 16. On March 26, it was announced that the bout would be moved to Bellator 258 on May 7. On April 29, it was announced that Yoel had failed his medicals due to an eye issue and the bout was pulled from the card, and the Grand Prix Tournament, being replaced by Jose Augusto.

Romero made his Bellator debut on September 18, 2021 at Bellator 266 against Phil Davis. He lost the bout via split decision.

Romero was scheduled to fight Melvin Manhoef on May 6, 2022 at Bellator 280. However, Manhoef withdrew from the bout due to a hand injury while stopping burglars and was replaced by Alex Polizzi. Yoel won the bout via TKO in the final seconds of the third round.

The bout against Melvin Manhoef was rescheduled this time for September 23, 2022 at Bellator 285. He won the bout via knockout on the ground via elbows in the third round.

Romero was scheduled to face Vadim Nemkov for the Bellator Light Heavyweight World Championship on February 4, 2023 at Bellator 290. However, Nemkov forced to withdraw due to undisclosed reason and the bout was scrapped.

Training 
Romero trains in Coconut Creek, Florida with the American Top Team, with fellow-UFC fighters including Robbie Lawler, Thiago Alves, Thiago Silva and Glover Teixeira.

Fighting style 
Romero is left-handed and primarily fights out of the southpaw stance, although he sometimes switches to an orthodox stance during fights. In spite of his amateur wrestling pedigree, Romero rarely uses his wrestling offensively inside the Octagon. Instead, Romero's boxing is typically considered his best skill, with the majority of his victories coming by way of knockout or technical knockout via punches. Many pundits cite Romero's pull-back left-handed counter as his most dangerous strike.

Tainted supplements lawsuit 

Romero was informed of a potential doping violation stemming from an out-of-competition test conducted by USADA  on January 13, 2016 after his bout with  Ronaldo Souza on December 12, 2015, at UFC 194, which Romero won via split decision.  On February 8, Romero and his manager explained that he had taken a supplement after his fight that turned out to be contaminated. His team and USADA both sent out the supplement for testing and it was confirmed that it contained a banned substance. That substance was not listed on the label, his manager said. They did not want to reveal the name of the supplement or the substance as USADA was investigating the issue. On March 23, it was announced that Romero would appeal his suspension. His team and USADA discussed a deal for a nine-month suspension for the fighter, but Romero preferred to go to arbitration. The typical USADA anti-doping violation suspension is two years. Eventually, on April 4, both parties reached an agreement for a six-month suspension. USADA revealed that Romero had tested positive for ibutamoren, a growth hormone release stimulator. An unopened version of the supplement was independently tested and the banned substance did indeed come up, even though it was not listed on the label. The result of the Souza fight was not overturned, as it was an out-of-competition test that occurred after the fight; Romero passed both his pre-fight and fight night tests for the Souza fight.

Romero pursued legal action against the supplement company, but they never interposed an answer.  After being awarded default judgment, Romero was awarded $27 million in damages: $3 million for lost wages, $3 million for reputable harm, and $3 million for emotional damage, all of which were tripled as allowed by the New Jersey “Consumer Fraud Act” when a company is “found out to have committed consumer fraud”. However, in mid-2021 it was reported that New Jersey Superior Court reduced the damage awards for lost wages and emotional stress to total of $12.45 million. The reputational damages will be decided in another trial meeting.

Championships and accomplishments

Mixed martial arts
Ultimate Fighting Championship          
Knockout of the Night (One time)  vs. Clifford Starks
Performance of the Night (Two times)  vs. Lyoto Machida and Chris Weidman
 Fight of the Night (Five times)  vs. Derek Brunson, Tim Kennedy, Robert Whittaker (x2), and Paulo Costa
MMA DNA.nl
 2018 Fight of the Year.
MMAJunkie.com
2019 August Fight of the Month vs. Paulo Costa

Mixed martial arts record

|-
|Win
|align=center| 15–6
|Melvin Manhoef
|KO (elbows)
|Bellator 285
|
|align=center| 3
|align=center| 3:34
|Dublin, Ireland
|
|-
|Win
|align=center|14–6
|Alex Polizzi
|TKO (punches)
|Bellator 280
|
|align=center|3
|align=center|4:59
|Paris, France
|
|- 
|Loss
|align=center|13–6
|Phil Davis
|Decision (split)
|Bellator 266
|
|align=center|3
|align=center|5:00
|San Jose, California, United States
|
|- 
|Loss
|align=center|13–5
|Israel Adesanya
|Decision (unanimous)
|UFC 248
|
|align=center|5
|align=center|5:00
|Las Vegas, United States
|
|-
|Loss
|align=center|13–4
|Paulo Costa
|Decision (unanimous)
|UFC 241 
|
|align=center|3
|align=center|5:00
|Anaheim, California, United States
|
|-
|Loss
|align=center|13–3
|Robert Whittaker
|Decision (split)
|UFC 225 
|
|align=center|5
|align=center|5:00
|Chicago, United States
|
|-
|Win
|align=center|13–2
|Luke Rockhold
|KO (punches)
|UFC 221 
|
|align=center|3
|align=center|1:48
|Perth, Australia
|
|-
|Loss
|align=center|12–2
|Robert Whittaker
|Decision (unanimous)
|UFC 213 
|
|align=center|5
|align=center|5:00
|Las Vegas, United States
|
|-
|Win
|align=center|12–1
|Chris Weidman
|KO (flying knee)
|UFC 205 
|
|align=center|3
|align=center|0:24
|New York City, United States
|
|-
|Win
|align=center|11–1
|Ronaldo Souza
|Decision (split)
|UFC 194
|
|align=center|3
|align=center|5:00
|Las Vegas, United States
|
|-
|Win
|align=center|10–1
|Lyoto Machida
|KO (elbows)
|UFC Fight Night: Machida vs. Romero
|
|align=center|3
|align=center|1:38
|Hollywood, Florida, United States
|
|- 
|Win
|align=center|9–1
|Tim Kennedy
|TKO (punches)
|UFC 178
|
|align=center|3
|align=center|0:58
|Las Vegas, United States
|
|-
|Win
|align=center|8–1
|Brad Tavares
|Decision (unanimous)
|UFC on Fox: Werdum vs. Browne
|
|align=center|3
|align=center|5:00
|Orlando, Florida, United States
|
|-
|Win
|align=center|7–1
|Derek Brunson
|TKO (punches and elbows)
|UFC Fight Night: Rockhold vs. Philippou
|
|align=center|3
|align=center|3:23
|Duluth, Georgia, United States
|
|-
|Win
|align=center|6–1
|Ronny Markes
|KO (punches)
|UFC: Fight for the Troops 3
|
|align=center|3
|align=center|1:39
|Fort Campbell, Kentucky, United States
|
|-
|Win
|align=center|5–1
|Clifford Starks
|KO (flying knee and punches)
|UFC on Fox: Henderson vs. Melendez
|
|align=center|1
|align=center|1:32
|San Jose, California, United States
|
|-
|Loss
|align=center|4–1
|Rafael Cavalcante
|KO (punches)
|Strikeforce: Barnett vs. Kharitonov
|
|align=center|2
|align=center|4:51
|Cincinnati, United States
|
|-
|Win
|align=center|4–0
|Laszlo Eck
|KO (punch)
|Fight of the Night 2011
|
|align=center|1
|align=center|0:33
|Greding, Germany
|
|-
|Win
|align=center|3–0
|Ņikita Petrovs
|TKO (retirement)
|SFC 3: MMA Fight Night
|
|align=center|1
|align=center|2:58
|Giessen, Germany
|
|-
|Win
|align=center|2–0
|Michał Fijałka
|TKO (retirement)
|IFF: The Eternal Struggle
|
|align=center|3
|align=center|4:05
|Dąbrowa Górnicza, Poland
|
|-
|Win
|align=center|1–0
|Sascha Weinpolter
|TKO (punches)
|Fight of the Night 2009
|
|align=center|1
|align=center|0:48
|Nuremberg, Germany
|
|-
|}

Pay-per-view bouts

Freestyle record

Submission grappling record 
{| class="wikitable sortable" style="font-size:80%; text-align:left;"
|-
| colspan=8 style="text-align:center;" | 1 Matches, 1 Wins, 0 Losses, 0 Draws
|-
!  Result
!  Rec.
!  Opponent
!  Method
!  text-center| Event
!  Date
!  Division
!  Location
|-
| Win ||align=center|1-0||  Chris Barnett || Submission (Kimura) || rowspan=2|Dean Toole Promotions || rowspan=2|June 15, 2019 || Openweight ||rowspan=2|  Pensacola, Florida

Personal life
Romero describes himself as a Christian and "a man of God" whose hero is Jesus Christ. His younger brother, Yoan Pablo Hernández, was the IBF Cruiserweight Champion in professional boxing.

Romero and his wife have one daughter, he  also has 2 daughters and a son in Cuba.

In a controversial post-fight interview after his victory over Lyoto Machida at UFC Fight Night 70, it was assumed by many that Romero was expressing disagreement with the Obergefell v. Hodges supreme court ruling. However, during the post fight press conference and subsequent interviews the following day, Romero denied referring to gay marriage and apologized for his comments while maintaining that they were misunderstood. Many thought Romero said "No for gay Jesus" while he actually said "No forget Jesus" as he is not fluent in English.

See also
 List of male mixed martial artists
 List of current Bellator fighters

References

External links

 
 
 

Living people
1977 births
Cuban Christians
Cuban male mixed martial artists
Cuban sportspeople in doping cases
Cuban male sport wrestlers
Doping cases in mixed martial arts
Light heavyweight mixed martial artists
Mixed martial artists utilizing freestyle wrestling
Wrestlers at the 2000 Summer Olympics
Wrestlers at the 2004 Summer Olympics
Olympic medalists in wrestling
Cuban emigrants to Germany
Cuban expatriates in the United States
World Wrestling Championships medalists
Medalists at the 2000 Summer Olympics
Pan American Games gold medalists for Cuba
Pan American Games bronze medalists for Cuba
Olympic silver medalists for Cuba
Pan American Games medalists in wrestling
People from Coconut Creek, Florida
World Wrestling Champions
Wrestlers at the 1999 Pan American Games
Wrestlers at the 2003 Pan American Games
Ultimate Fighting Championship male fighters
Middleweight mixed martial artists
Medalists at the 2003 Pan American Games
People from Pinar del Río